V. Z. Durai (born Peer Moideen) is an Indian film director who has worked in the Tamil film industry.

Film career

2000-2010
Durai eventually approached S. S. Chakravarthy to make the film Mugavaree (2000) with Ajith Kumar. As Durai had no prior experience working with film, Chakravarthy contributed significantly to shooting and editing, while also helping sign the actor Jyothika in the film, which turned out to be a blockbuster. Prior to the release of the film, Ajith, who has happy with the final product, gifted a car to Durai. Mugavaree ran for 100 days in cinemas. The success of the film led to the Durai and Kumar to make another film together featuring co-stars R. Madhavan and Vikram. However, they later scrapped and dropped the film. The production company for Mugavaree later offered for Durai to direct the film Kadhal Sadugudu featuring Vikram and Priyanka Trivedi , Which did not gross that well

In 2005, Durai directed the gangster film Thotti Jaya starring Silambarasan and Gopika. This film was a blockbuster at box office.Thotti Jaya Over the years became a cult classic and even after 15years it was celebrated by fans and media.It was Silambarasan's First gangster venture, A Sequel to this is much anticipated.  Durai's fourth film was Nepali, starring Bharath and Meera Jasmine. According to critics, this film turned out to be very different from Durai's usual productions and did not gross well.

2010-2019
After Nepali, Durai took a five-year hiatus from directing movies and instead directed advertisements and focusing more on his international constructions and Ad Film Company. After the hiatus, he directed 6, which cast actors Shaam and Poonam Kaur.The film received praise from stars like Bala, who honoured him with a chain, and Kannada star Sudeep Sanjeev, who praised both Shaam and Durai for their excellent work. Shaam reportedly went without sleep for days during filming. Durai again took a five-year hiatus before directing Yemaali in 2018.

Since 2018, Durai has directed the horror-thriller movie Iruttu starring Sundar C. (released 6 December 2019). The film was a hit horror thriller, with critics praising it for its unexplored elements and investigative angle. The film was a break for Sundar C., the film completed 50days of theatrical run and was declared as a ‘hit’. Durai Next directed 'Narkali' Starring Actor turned director Ameer. Durai started his own production company 'Right Eye Theatres' sidelining his previous first copy ventures and his advertisements and constructions. His first Production is the hit combo of himself and Sundar C.,which is expected to be a sequel to one of the biggest hits of 2005, Thalainagaram

Advertisements
Durai founded a company called Addlime, through which he directed several international advertisements in Dubai, Ukraine, Thailand, and London. In London, he did various corporate films for Medican Medical Cannabis. His wife and him associated for several advertisements such as The Chennai Silks, City Union Bank Limited (CUB) , BharatMatrimony etc.

Constructions
Durai prior to becoming a film director , worked in a firm called 'sunland group of companies' founded and headed by his brother in law. He worked as the managing director for several projects

Filmography

Awards and nominations

Honours 
 NIC Arts Production House for Excellence Commercial Success;– Honoured for Mugavaree (2000)

References

External links
 

Tamil film directors
Living people
20th-century Indian film directors
21st-century Indian film directors
1971 births